Medan Station is the main railway station in Medan, North Sumatra, Indonesia. In addition to intercity services operated by Indonesia's national rail operator, Kereta Api Indonesia, the station also has service to Kualanamu International Airport via Kualanamu ARS.

The rail line contained in Medan Station stretched from north to south. From Medan stations are branching former rail to Pancur Batu and Deli Tua. This station has city check-in for passengers at newly Kualanamu International Airport, this service also the first in throughout Indonesia.

In 2006, Medan Station get Prima Utama Award for the best public service transport unit.

History
Medan Station was opened on 25 July 1886 by Deli Spoorweg Maatschappij. At the time there is a 16.7-kilometer railway stretching from the station to Labuan Station in northern Medan, linking Medan city center to the Port of Belawan.

Medan Station architecture has undergone a complete overhaul from the original form. The only remainings of the old station on the current building complex is a clock tower in front of the station, a Dutch-style locomotive depot, the platform roof that houses lanes 2 and 3, and a suspension bridge at the station's southern end.

Services
Passenger trains that use this station are:
 Kualanamu ARS to Kualanamu
 Sribilah to 
 Putri Deli to 
 Siantar Express to 

Bus connection
As of 2022, Medan Station is connected to all five corridors of Trans Metro Deli BRT and Corridor 1 of Trans Mebidang BRT.

References

External links
 

Buildings and structures in Medan
Railway stations in North Sumatra
Cultural Properties of Indonesia in North Sumatra